Botswana participated at the 2018 Summer Youth Olympics in Buenos Aires, Argentina from 6 October to 18 October 2018.

Athletics

Swimming

Boys

Girls

References

2018 in Botswana sport
Nations at the 2018 Summer Youth Olympics
Botswana at the Youth Olympics